Rowland Sutherland is a British flautist, who studied flute at the Guildhall School of Music and Drama with Kathryn Lukas, Philippa Davies and Peter Lloyd and participated in master classes given by the late Geoffrey Gilbert. He studied jazz with the late pianist Lionel Grigson in the mid-1980s. Sutherland performs in new music ensembles, jazz groups, symphony  orchestras, various non-Western groups, pop outfits and as a soloist. Many of Sutherland's solo contemporary flute performances have been broadcast on BBC Radio 3.  He has also composed and arranged music for groups, ensembles and for the BBC.

Sutherland is a professor at the Trinity College of Music and the Guildhall School of Music and Drama.  He has worked at the York and Durham Universities and the Centre for Young Musicians, Morley College, giving consultations and workshops. He is also tutor in jazz flute at the Royal Northern College of Music.

Sutherland fronts his own band, Mistura, who perform Brazilian jazz fusion alongside Afro-Cuban and pan-African grooves and have released the album Coast to Coast. Mistura have performed at a number of the leading jazz festivals in Britain, including at Glastonbury, Glasgow, and Greenwich. In 1998 Mistura supported pianist and singer Tania Maria at the Queen Elizabeth Hall in London.

Sutherland has played and recorded with many new music ensembles and dance companies in Britain.  These include New Music Players, Ixion, Icebreaker, Lontano, London Musici, Uroboros, Music Projects/London, Phoenix Dance, Jazz Xchange Music and Dance and Rambert Dance Company. In 2003 the New Music Players' CD Crying Bird, Echoing Star featured Sutherland's composition "Timeless Odyssey".

In 2004 Rowland was one of the featured jazz soloists with the BBC Concert Orchestra and the Russell Maliphant dance company, performing works by Barry Adamson at the Barbican Centre.

References

Year of birth missing (living people)
Living people
British flautists
Jazz Warriors members
FMR Records artists
Alumni of the Guildhall School of Music and Drama
Academics of the Guildhall School of Music and Drama
Academics of Trinity College of Music